Várhelyi may refer to:

People
 Péter Várhelyi (born April 15, 1950) a Hungarian sprint canoer 
 Olivér Várhelyi, Hungarian diplomat